Hofstetten is a municipality in the district of Landsberg in Bavaria in Germany. It has 1759 inhabitants.

References

Landsberg (district)